Gekko ernstkelleri is a species of gecko, a lizard in the family Gekkonidae. The species is endemic to the Philippines.

Etymology
The specific name, ernstkelleri, is in honor of Ernst Keller, who is a German supporter of gecko conservation.

Geographic range
G. ernstkelleri is found on the northwest peninsula of the island of Panay in the Philippines.

Description
The total length (including tail) of G. ernstkelleri can exceed .

Habitat
It is locally common within its small range.

References

Further reading
Rösler H, Siler CD, Brown RM, Demegillo AD, Gaulke M (2006). "Gekko ernstkelleri sp. n. – a new gekkonid lizard from Panay Island Philippines". Salamandra 42 (4): 197–211.

ernstkelleri
Reptiles of the Philippines
Endemic fauna of the Philippines
Fauna of Panay
Reptiles described in 2006